The 1967 Yale Bulldogs football team represented Yale University in the 1967 NCAA University Division football season.  The Bulldogs were led by third-year head coach Carmen Cozza, played their home games at the Yale Bowl and finished first in the Ivy League with a 7–0 record, 8–1 overall.

Schedule

References

Yale
Yale Bulldogs football seasons
Ivy League football champion seasons
Yale Bulldogs football